Hell and High Water may refer to:

Film and television
Hell and High Water (1933 film), an American Pre-Code drama film
Hell and High Water (1954 film), a Cold War drama film
"Hell and High Water", an episode of ER (season 2)
"Hell and High Water", an episode of Bugs

Literature
Hell and High Water (book), by Joseph J. Romm, 2006
Hell and High Water: Climate Change, Hope and the Human Condition, by Alastair McIntosh, 2008

Music
"Hell and High Water" (T. Graham Brown song), 1986
"Hell and High Water" (Black Stone Cherry song), 2006
"Hell and High Water", a song by The Allman Brothers Band from the 1980 album Reach for the Sky

See also

Hell or High Water (disambiguation)